The Blue Mountains are the longest mountain range in Jamaica. They include the island's highest point, Blue Mountain Peak, at 2256 m  (7402 ft). From the summit, accessible via a walking track, both the north and south coasts of the island can be seen. The mountain range spans four parishes: Portland, St. Thomas, St. Mary and St. Andrew.

Geography

The Blue Mountains dominate the eastern third of Jamaica, while bordering the eastern parishes of Portland, St. Thomas, St. Mary and St. Andrew to the south. Part of the Blue Mountains is contained in the Blue and John Crow Mountains National Park established in 1992, which is maintained by the Jamaican government.

This forms cooling relief from the sweltering heat of the city of Kingston, visible below.

Rainfall

Climate
High elevations of the Blue Mountains have a subtropical highland climate (Cfb) under the Köppen climate classification.

Flora and fauna
The Blue Mountains climatic diversity has led to the growth of diverse and lush vegetation including towering trees and more than 500 species of flowering plants.

The mountains are home to the world's second-largest butterfly and the largest in the Americas, the Homerus swallowtail. This is the most well-studied remaining population of the endangered butterfly. The Jamaican coney (Geocapromys brownii), a type of hutia, and the Jamaican boa (Chilabothrus subflavus) are also found there.

Jamaican coffee

In past years when Jamaica's economy was dominated by plantation slavery, some slaves escaped to the mountains to live independently, where they were known as Jamaican Maroons. Charles Town, Jamaica on the Buff Bay River in central Portland, Moore Town in eastern Portland, and Scott's Hall, Jamaica in St Mary are the contemporary communities of Windward Maroons.

Today, the famous Jamaican Blue Mountain Coffee, which commands premium prices on world markets, is cultivated between  
Hagley Gap and Mavis Bank are farming communities located on Blue Mountain with Hagley Gap being closest to Blue Mountain Peak. Both towns rely upon the area's rich soil for growing coffee.

References

External links

 Blue Mountains, Jamaica
 Read about life on a Jamaican Blue Mountain Coffee Farm

 
Mountain ranges of Jamaica
World Heritage Sites in Jamaica